The Wrestler is a 1974 independent film directed by Jim Westman, produced by professional wrestler Verne Gagne and W.R. Frank, starring Ed Asner as Frank Bass, a wrestling promoter. Verne Gagne also stars in the film as Mike Bullard, the current wrestling champion of his "league". After a long reign as champion, Bullard is getting older and feeling pressure from all sides, including his wife and wrestling promoters, to pass the championship to Billy Taylor and retire. Bullard's resistance to their requests that he step aside is the central conflict in the film. The film presents professional wrestling as a truly competitive sport, always maintaining the illusion that matches are a result of athletic combat and not pre-determined outcomes decided before the matches.

At one point during the film, a number of wrestlers who had either died during a match or as a result of in-ring injuries are mentioned. That list of names was not fictional, but taken from the history of professional wrestling.

Plot
Professional wrestling promoter Frank Bass (Ed Asner) has to deal with the pressures of running a professional wrestling promotion, facing the pressures of constantly finding new wrestlers to pull in the crowds, keeping the wrestlers he has under contract under control and especially dealing with the fact that the top man, the champion of "the League" Mike Bullard (Verne Gagne) is getting old and there is pressure to replace him with a younger wrestler. One such possible replacement is the latest challenger Billy Taylor (Billy Robinson). At one point, Bass meets with a number of other wrestling promoters (played by real life wrestling promoters from the National Wrestling Alliance, including Vincent J. McMahon) to possibly create a "Super Bowl of Wrestling". Facing pressure, Frank Bass decides to back Bullard as he faces the challenger Billy Taylor in the climax of the movie.

Cast

As themselves
The film features a number of actual wrestlers in the role of the various wrestlers throughout the movie, most of them worked for Verne Gagne's American Wrestling Association at the time The Wrestler was filmed. The Wrestler also mixed in footage from actual wrestling shows, creating the setting for the film while not being important to the actual plot of the film.

Wrestlers

Wrestling promoters

Other roles

Production

The movie was filmed in Minnesota, with Saint Paul's historic Landmark Center serving as the location of Frank Bass (Ed Asner)'s office.

Critical reception
Variety noted, "Technical credits are so-so, offering nothing out of the ordinary ... Box-office potential appears fair for this low budgeter because of the vast following pro wrestling enjoys, but hefty ballyhooing will be needed." Gene Siskel of the Chicago Tribune gave the film two stars out of four, calling it "as predictable as, well, a wrestling match ... All of the material outside the ring seems phony compared to the real phoniness inside the ropes." Jill Forbes wrote in The Monthly Film Bulletin: "Designed to appeal mainly to the converted, The Wrestler is not without its attractions for non-enthusiasts of the sport," adding that "the comic set-pieces really carry the film."

See also
 List of American films of 1974

References

External links

1974 films
American independent films
Professional wrestling films
Films set in Minnesota
Films shot in Minnesota
1970s English-language films
1974 independent films
1970s American films